The Honda RA106 (originally known as the BAR 008) was the car with which the Honda team competed in the  Formula One season.  It was driven by Rubens Barrichello, who joined from Ferrari, and Jenson Button, who had spent three seasons with the team as British American Racing.  The year marked the first time Honda had competed as a full team since ; since then it had only competed as an engine supplier until taking over BAR completely in late . Honda used 'Lucky Strike' logos in Bahrain, Malaysia, Australia, Monaco, and Japan, and '555' logos in China. In China all team members and drivers, used blue-yellow overalls and clothing throughout the weekend.

History

Although the year was a significant improvement from Honda's performance in 1968 and BAR's performance in 2005, Honda was unable to challenge for the world championship after impressive winter testing form.  The car was quick in qualifying but less so in the races.  A performance slump mid-season also led to the team parting company with the car's designer, Geoff Willis, and he was replaced by the inexperienced Shuhei Nakamoto.

However, things improved from the German GP, culminating in Button's first F1 win in Hungary.  Button was generally the stronger driver throughout the season, and it was felt that he deserved to get Honda's first win in their F1 return.

Honda finished the season strongly with a run of points finishes, culminating in a third-place finish for Button at the final race in Brazil.  They also successfully introduced their -spec engine before the season was over.

The team eventually finished fourth in the Constructors' Championship, with 86 points.

The RA106 formed the basis of the Super Aguri SA07.

The RA106 was also the last Honda-powered car to achieve a Grand Prix victory until Max Verstappen won the 2019 Austrian Grand Prix in the Red Bull Racing RB15.

Complete Formula One results
(key) (results in bold indicate pole position)

References 

Racecar Engineering technical review

Honda Formula One cars
2006 Formula One season cars